Geumseonsa is a Buddhist temple of the Jogye Order in Seoul, South Korea. Believed to have been established before 1405 it is located in 196-1 Gugi-dong in the Jongno-gu area of the city.

See also
List of Buddhist temples in Seoul

External links
koreatemple.net

Buddhist temples in Seoul
Jongno District
Buddhist temples of the Jogye Order